Hajj Mazarb (also Romanized as Ḩājj Maʿẕarb) is a village in Sorkheh Rural District, Fath Olmobin District, Shush County, Khuzestan Province, Iran. At the 2006 census, its population was 35, in 6 families.

References 

Populated places in Shush County